Sir John Wallop (c. 1490–1551) was an English soldier and diplomat.

John Wallop may also refer to:
John Wallop, 1st Earl of Portsmouth (1690–1762), British peer and Member of Parliament
John Wallop, 2nd Earl of Portsmouth (1742–1797), British nobleman
John Wallop, 3rd Earl of Portsmouth (1767–1853), British nobleman and lunatic
John Wallop (died 1405), MP for Salisbury
John Wallop, Viscount Lymington (1718–1749), British politician